Buddleja misionum is a species endemic to dry rocky fields and roadsides in southern Paraguay, the Rio Grande do Sul in Brazil, and the provinces of Corrientes and Misiones in Argentina; it was first described and named by Kraenzlin in 1913.

Description
Buddleja misionum is a dioecious shrub 1 – 2 m high, with tan fissured bark. The branches are subquadrangular and covered with a dense tomentum. The sessile lanceolate to elliptic leaves are 5.5 – 10 cm long by 1.4 – 4 cm wide, lanose above and below. The yellow inflorescences are 15 – 30 cm long, comprising 5 – 15 pairs of heads  1 – 1.5 cm in diameter located in the axils of the terminal leaves, each head with > 20 flowers; the corolla tubes 4.5 – 5 mm long.

Cultivation
The shrub is not known to be in cultivation.

References

misionum
Flora of Argentina
Flora of Brazil
Flora of Paraguay
Flora of South America
Taxa named by Friedrich Wilhelm Ludwig Kraenzlin
Dioecious plants